Anne Gueret (1760–1805) was a French musician and painter working at the end of the 18th century and the beginning of the 19th century. Anne and her sister Louise Catherine Gueret were orphaned as children but were adopted by Michel-Jean Sedaine. He introduced them to painters Henri-Pierre Danloux and Jacques-Louis David who gave them art lessons. In 1793 Anne had her first Salon debut. She continued to exhibit in Salons until 1801 presenting mainly portraits.

After Anne Gueret married Bernier Henri-Pierre, Danloux painted a small-scale portrait of her. Roger Portalis, French engraver and art critic, claims that Danloux always kept an image of her with him.

Iconographies of Anne and Louise Catherine Gueret
 Henri-Pierre Danloux, Portrait d'Anne Guéret, tableau.
 Henri-Pierre Danloux, Portrait de Louise Catherine Guéret, dessin.
 Jacques-Louis David, (attribué à), Portrait présumé de Catherine Guéret, Rouen, Musée des Beaux-Arts, cette toile porte une signature David.
 Mlle Guerrier, Portrait de Louise Catherine, salon de la Correspondance de 1783.

Artwork at a public sale
Portrait d'une artiste appuyée sur un portefeuille was exhibited by Anne Guéret at the Salon of 1793, and it is now in a private collection in France. It was done with black chalk, with stumping, with pen and grey ink and grey wash, extensively heightened with white gouache on buff paper. 320 x 404 mm. (12 5/8 x 15 7/8 in.)

References 

French women painters
18th-century French women musicians
1760 births
1805 deaths